Aframomum is a genus in the ginger family, Zingiberaceae. It is widespread across tropical Africa as well as on some islands of the Indian Ocean (Madagascar, Seychelles, and Mauritius). It is represented by approximately 50 species. It is larger than other genera in its family. Its species are perennials and produce colorful flowers.

Aframomum melegueta (Melegueta pepper) is an economically important edible crop in West Africa.

Species
Species are:

See also 
 Amomum

References

 
Zingiberaceae genera